Bernard Georges (born 24 August 1955) is a Seychellois politician who currently serves as the Leader of Government Business in the National Assembly of Seychelles.

Biography

A lawyer by profession, he is a member of the Seychelles National Party, and was first elected to the Assembly in 2002.  Georges' popularity in Seychelles was fueled in part by his radio program on Seychelles Broadcasting Corporation's SBC Radio which explained the laws and how they worked to people of Seychelles.  He and his wife, Annette, run the law firm, "Georges and Georges", which specializes in property and commercial disputes.  In 2015, he was appointed to Judge of the Court of Justice for the Common Market for Eastern and Southern Africa.

Education
He is a graduate of Fitzwilliam College, Cambridge.

References

Member page on Assembly website
Georges is appointed Judge of the Court of Justice

1955 births
Living people
Members of the National Assembly (Seychelles)
People from Les Mamelles
Seychellois lawyers
Seychelles National Party politicians
Seychellois people of French descent
Alumni of Fitzwilliam College, Cambridge